The Malaysian Maritime Enforcement Agency uses cutters and small boats on the water, and fixed and rotary wing (helicopters) as well UAVs in the air.  The Coast Guard employs various small arm including handgun, shotgun, rifle, and machine gun.

Ship

Aircraft

Firearm

Historical equipment

Ship
Sipadan-class
32 meter ship built by United Kingdom. A total of 16 ships were transferred from Royal Malaysian Navy. All retired from MMEA's service. Some of the ships were sunk as artificial reefs.

PX Wooden Hull
A total of 9 PX Wooden Hull of Royal Malaysia Police tranferred to MMEA. All retired from MMEA's service. Some of the ships were sunk as artificial reefs.

Procurement

See also
 List of equipment of the Malaysian Army
 List of equipment of the Royal Malaysian Navy
 List of equipment of the Royal Malaysian Air Force
 List of aircraft of the Malaysian Armed Forces
 List of vehicles of the Royal Malaysian Police
 List of police firearms in Malaysia

References

 
Malaysian Maritime Enforcement Agency
Ships by coast guard